God kveld Norge is a Norwegian celebrity and entertainment program hosted by Dorthe Skappel since it was launched on TV2 in 1997. Its title transelates to Good Evening Norway. The theme music is based on Mozart's Requiem.

Crew in God kveld Norge

Dorthe Skappel (host)
Anne-Karin Lundeby (executive of productions)
Tina Falster (executive of reporters)
Bård Eriksen (project-leader)
Vegard B. Normann (reporter)
Per Joar Holm (photographer/editor)
Morten L. Kristoffersen (photographer/editor)
Johanne Skaarnæs (photographer/editor)
Eva Kynningsrud Dobbing (reporter)
Geir Håkonsund (reporter)
Ståle Winterkjær (reporter)

References

External links 
Official homepage

1997 Norwegian television series debuts
1990s Norwegian television series
TV 2 (Norway) original programming
Norwegian television talk shows